Attorney General Marston may refer to:

George Marston (Massachusetts politician) (1821–1883), Attorney General of Massachusetts
Isaac Marston (1839–1891), Attorney General of Michigan

See also
General Marston (disambiguation)